The Roseanne Show was a syndicated talk show hosted by American actress Roseanne Barr following the end of her long-running sitcom. The show featured Roseanne interviewing a mixture of quirky guests along with Roseanne's signature style of brassy, in-your-face, domestic goddess comedy. The Roseanne Show was the first to be recorded digitally. During the show's run there were also live call-ins from viewers and celebrities. Sometimes during a taping there was a webchat during the taping and after the show. The set of the show consisted of a living room, a kitchen, and a garden scene. The set rotated to present a different interview setting. The show also featured skits with audience member participation. Skits included Judge Roseanne, The Dr. Is In-sane and a dating game-esque skit. Some skits also included her producer Mary Pelloni. Throughout the show's entire two-year run, Dailey Pike was Roseanne's warmup guy and sidekick regular on the show. In season one, Zach Hope was Roseanne's cyber sidekick. Later in season two, Michael Fishman, who portrayed D.J. Conner on Roseanne, replaced Hope as Roseanne's cyber sidekick.

Notable people who performed on The Roseanne Show were Enrique Iglesias, Sheryl Crow, Mick Foley, Janice Robinson, Lulu, LFO, Joan Jett, Pat Benatar, and Tori Amos.

On October 7, 1999, John Lydon was scheduled to appear on the show but was removed before rehearsal for having his own camera crew backstage despite having written consent from the producer. The entire show with John Lydon was canceled, along with the rest of the week's tapings. After that week, the show continued production until June 2000.

It aired for two seasons and was taped before a live studio audience at CBS Television City stage 46 in Hollywood, California. It was produced by King World Productions under co-production of Roseanne's own company, Full Moon and High Tide Productions. The show cleared and aired in 85% of markets and ran from September 14, 1998 to June 23, 2000, with reruns airing until September 8 of that year. 281 episodes of the show were produced. The rights are now owned by CBS Television Distribution.

Reception

The show received negative reviews from critics.

References

External links
 
 TV Guide episode guide
 Cache of show's website

First-run syndicated television programs in the United States
Television series by King World Productions
1990s American television talk shows
2000s American television talk shows
1998 American television series debuts
2000 American television series endings
Television series created by Roseanne Barr